Digitivalva sibirica is a moth of the family Acrolepiidae. It is found in China (Guizhou, Yunnan), Russia (Primorskiy kray, Khabarovskaya oblast,
Amurskaya oblast, Yuzhniye Kurili), Korea and Japan (Honshu).

References

Acrolepiidae
Moths described in 1958
Moths of Japan